Thomas Steinherr (born 4 May 1993) is a German footballer who plays as a winger for TSV 1860 Rosenheim.

References

External links

Thomas Steinherr at Instagram

1993 births
Living people
People from Aichach-Friedberg
Sportspeople from Swabia (Bavaria)
German footballers
FC Augsburg players
SpVgg Unterhaching players
VfR Aalen players
FC 08 Homburg players
FC Carl Zeiss Jena players
TSV 1860 Rosenheim players
Footballers from Bavaria
3. Liga players
Regionalliga players
Association football wingers